Robert Hettinga, is a technical and political writer with a focus on financial cryptography.
Robert was well known for his postings on the Cypherpunk and e$ and e$pam mailing list and founded the Internet Bearer Underwriting Corporation (IBUC).

Robert was also one of the founders the world's first conference on financial cryptography, FC97, on the island of Anguilla.

References 

 "Digital Bearer Settlement" - April 1998
 "The Geodesic Market" - June 1998
 "How to Underwrite a Digital Bearer Security"- July 1998
 "'All the bonds in Christendom': Digital Bearer Bonds"- September 1998
 "Russell's Revenge: Digital Bearer Equity"- October 1998
 "Digital bearer derivatives - mathematics of polite fiction" - November 1998
 "One-Way Hash and Micromoney Mitochondria: Digital Bearer Micropayment"- December 1998
 "Hit 'em where they ain't': deploying digital bearer transactions"- February 1999
 "Internet bearer underwriting: it's time"- April 1999
 "Endpiece: How to build a bearer underwriting revenue model"- May 1999
 "How will the regulators work in the new net economy?"- July 1999
 "Divine Providence - Internet content without transfer pricing"- September 1999
 "The Geodesic Economy" - December 1999

External links 
 Robert Hettinga and Digital Bearer Settlement
Financial Cryptography 97
Mac-Crypto 1997
InfoWorld: Opendoc unleashed on the Internet 11/6/1995 
Hetting's Rants
A Market Model for Digital Bearer Instrument Underwriting
The Geodesic Economy

Cypherpunks
Internet activists
Living people
Financial cryptography
American technology writers
Year of birth missing (living people)